Paul is an unincorporated community in Otoe County, Nebraska, in the United States.

History
A post office was established at Paul in 1884, and remained in operation until it was discontinued in 1955. The community was named for Paulinus Kuwitzky, the original owner of the town site.

Paul was a station on the Missouri Pacific Railroad.

References

Unincorporated communities in Otoe County, Nebraska
Unincorporated communities in Nebraska